The 2017–18 Biathlon World Cup – Stage 6 was the 6th event of the season and was held in Antholz, Italy, from 18 January until 21 January 2018.

Schedule of events

Medal winners

Men

Women

References 

Biathlon World Cup - Stage 6, 2017-18
2017–18 Biathlon World Cup
Biathlon World Cup - Stage 6
Biathlon competitions in Italy